La Grande may refer to:

 La Grande, Oregon, a city in Union County, Oregon, United States.
 La Grande River, a river in northwestern Quebec, Canada
 LaGrande Technology, the Intel technology
 La Grande-Motte, a commune in the Hérault département in Occitanie in southern France